The 2000 Toray Pan Pacific Open was a women's tennis tournament played on indoor carpet courts. It was the 17th edition of the Toray Pan Pacific Open, and was part of the Tier I Series of the 2000 WTA Tour. It took place at the Tokyo Metropolitan Gymnasium in Tokyo, Japan, from January 29 through February 6, 2000. First-seeded Martina Hingis won the singles title and earned $166,000 first-prize money.

Finals

Singles

 Martina Hingis defeated  Sandrine Testud 6–3, 7–5
 It was Hingis' 1st singles title of the year and the 27th of her career.

Doubles

 Martina Hingis /  Mary Pierce  defeated  Alexandra Fusai /  Nathalie Tauziat 6–4, 6–1

External links
 Official website
 ITF tournament edition details
 Tournament draws

Toray Pan Pacific Open
Pan Pacific Open
Toray Pan Pacific Open
Toray Pan Pacific Open
Toray Pan Pacific Open
Toray Pan Pacific Open